Tobias Thomsen (born 19 October 1992) is a Danish professional footballer who plays as a forward for Danish 1st Division club Hvidovre IF.

Club career
He made his Danish Superliga debut for HB Køge on 25 July 2011 in a game against FC Midtjylland.

References

External links
 

1992 births
Living people
Danish men's footballers
Danish expatriate men's footballers
HB Køge players
Næstved Boldklub players
Akademisk Boldklub players
Knattspyrnufélag Reykjavíkur players
Valur (men's football) players
Hvidovre IF players
Danish Superliga players
Danish 1st Division players
Úrvalsdeild karla (football) players
Association football forwards
Danish expatriate sportspeople in Iceland
Expatriate footballers in Iceland
Nykøbing FC players
Danish 2nd Division players